The 1989 World Marathon Cup was the third edition of the World Marathon Cup of athletics and were held in Milan, Italy.

Results

Individual men

Individual women

References

Results
IAAF World Cup Men. Association of Road Racing Statisticians. Retrieved 2018-03-30.
IAAF World Cup Women. Association of Road Racing Statisticians. Retrieved 2018-03-30.

World Marathon Cup
World
World Marathon Cup
Marathons in Italy
International athletics competitions hosted by Italy